The 2021 Tour du Rwanda was a road cycling stage race that took place in Rwanda between 2 and 9 May 2021. The race was rated as a category 2.1 event on the 2021 UCI Africa Tour calendar, and was the 24th edition of the Tour du Rwanda.

The race was originally scheduled to be held from 21 to 28 February, but due to the COVID-19 pandemic, it had to be postponed and rescheduled to early May.

Teams 
One UCI WorldTeam, three UCI ProTeams, eight UCI Continental teams, and four national teams made up the 16 teams that participated in the race. Each team competed with five riders, for a total of 75 riders, of which 61 finished.

UCI WorldTeams

 

UCI ProTeams

 
 
 

UCI Continental Teams

 
 
 
 
 
 
 
 

National Teams

 Algeria
 Eritrea
 Ethiopia
 Rwanda

Route 
The complete route of the 2021 Tour du Rwanda was revealed on 29 November 2020. Like in previous editions, the Rwandan capital, Kigali, featured heavily in the race, being a start and/or finish location on all but one of the eight stages. The Mur de Kigali time trial on stage 7, which often draws out large crowds along its infamous cobbled sector, continued to make its appearance in the race.

Stages

Stage 1 
2 May 2021 — Kigali (Kigali Arena) to Rwamagana,

Stage 2 
3 May 2021 — Kigali (MIC Building) to Huye,

Stage 3 
4 May 2021 — Nyanza to Gicumbi,

Stage 4 
5 May 2021 — Kigali (Kimironko) to Musanze,

Stage 5 
6 May 2021 — Nyagatare to Kigali (Kimironko),

Stage 6 
7 May 2021 — Kigali (Rond Point KBC) to Kigali (Mont Kigali),

Stage 7 
8 May 2021 — Kigali (Nyamirambo) to Kigali (Mur de Kigali),  (ITT)

Stage 8 
9 May 2021 — Kigali (Canal Olympia) to Kigali (Canal Olympia),

Classification leadership table 

 On stage 3, Valentin Ferron, who was third in the young rider classification, wore the light blue jersey, because first placed Santiago Umba wore the yellow jersey as the leader of the general classification, and second placed Salim Kipkemboi wore the green jersey as the leader of the African rider classification.
 On stage 4, Bernardo Suaza, who was second in the sprints classification, wore the dark blue jersey, because first placed Lennert Teugels wore the orange jersey as the leader of the mountains classification. For the same reason, Tomas Goytom wore the dark blue jersey on stages 5, 7, and 8, while Andreas Goeman wore the dark blue jersey on stage 6.
 On stage 6, Kent Main, who was third in the African rider classification, wore the green jersey, because first placed Metkel Eyob wore the yellow jersey as the leader of the general classification, and second placed Nahom Zerai wore the light blue jersey as the leader of the young rider classification.

Final classification standings

General classification

Mountains classification

African rider classification

Rwandan rider classification

Young rider classification

Sprints classification

Team classification

Notes

References

External links 
 

2021
Tour du Rwanda
Tour du Rwanda
Tour du Rwanda
Tour du Rwanda